Andrzej Głyda (born 12 September 1979 in Poznań) is a Polish sport shooter. He was selected to compete for Poland in two editions of the Olympic Games (2000 and 2004), and eventually won two career medals, a gold and a silver, in a major international competition, spanning the World and European Championships. Głyda is a member of the shooting team for WSK Śląsk Wrocław, and a resident athlete of the Polish Sport Shooting Federation, where he trains throughout his sporting career under head coach and 1976 Olympic bronze medalist Wiesław Gawlikowski.

Głyda's Olympic debut came as a 21-year-old newcomer at the 2000 Summer Olympics in Sydney, where he tallied 121 birds out of a possible 125 to establish a joint fourteen-place tie with five other shooters, including Australia's home favorite Clive Barton and defending Olympic champion Ennio Falco of Italy, in the men's skeet.

In 2003, Głyda claimed his first ever gold medal in a spectacular fashion at the ISSF World Shotgun Championships in Nicosia, Cyprus with a score of 146, boosting a single-target lead over top three finalists Jin Di of China and Shawn Dulohery of the United States. Coming atop the podium, Głyda also gained an Olympic quota place for Poland, and was eventually selected to compete in his second Games.

At the 2004 Summer Olympics in Athens, Głyda qualified for his second Polish team as a lone shooter in the men's skeet, by having registered a minimum qualifying score of 122 from his fantastic top finish at the World Shotgun Championships less than a year earlier. Clearly one of the frontrunners vying for an Olympic medal as a defending World champion, Głyda slipped out of his contention to an unprecedented tie with seven other shooters for twenty-first place in the qualifying round, shooting an identical score of 119 birds.

References

External links

Polish Olympic Committee Bio 

1979 births
Living people
Polish male sport shooters
Olympic shooters of Poland
Shooters at the 2000 Summer Olympics
Shooters at the 2004 Summer Olympics
Sportspeople from Poznań